The Honourable Evelyn Henry Frederick Pierrepont (18 January 1775 – 22 October 1801), was a British Member of Parliament.

Pierrepont was the eldest son of Charles Pierrepont, 1st Earl Manvers, by Anne, daughter of William Mills, of Richmond, Surrey. Charles Pierrepont, 2nd Earl Manvers and Henry Pierrepont were his younger brothers.

Pierrepont was returned to parliament for Bossiney in April 1796, but already the following month he succeeded his father (who had been ennobled as Viscount Newark) as Member of Parliament for Nottinghamshire, a seat he held until his early death five years later.

Pierrepont died in October 1801, aged 26, predeceasing his father. He was replaced by his brother Charles as MP for Nottinghamshire. His memorial is in St. Edmund's Church, Holme Pierrepont.

References

1775 births
1801 deaths
Members of the Parliament of Great Britain for constituencies in Cornwall
Members of the Parliament of Great Britain for English constituencies
British MPs 1790–1796
Heirs apparent who never acceded
Evelyn
Members of the Parliament of the United Kingdom for English constituencies
UK MPs 1801–1802